Pandak is a village and one of the 44 union councils or administrative subdivisions of Haripur District in the Khyber Pakhtunkhwa province of Pakistan. Pandak is divided into two sections, or Mohallahs: Upper Pandak and Lower Pandak.

References

Union councils of Haripur District